The following is a table of Allied shipping losses in the Battle of the Atlantic during World War II.  All shipping losses are in Gross Registered Tonnage (GRT).

Total losses by U-boats: 14,668,785

References
 Runyan, Timothy J.; Copes, Jan M. To Die Gallantly: The Battle of the Atlantic, pgs. 85, 86
 Burns, R. W.;Warwick, K.; Rees, D. Radar Development to 1945, pg. 260
 Hickam, Homer H. Torpedo Junction: U-Boat War Off America's East Coast, 1942, pg. 2
 Beesly, Patrick; Erskine, Ralph; Gardner, W. J. R. Very Special Intelligence, pg. 173

Battle of the Atlantic